Alamdar S. Hamdani (born 1971/1972) is an American lawyer who has served as the United States attorney for the Southern District of Texas since December 2022.

Early life and education 
Hamdani was born in Manchester, England, to Indian parents who had moved there from Surat, Gujarat, India. He moved with his family to Euless, Texas, at the age of ten, and graduated from Trinity High School there in 1989. He received a Bachelor of Business Administration in finance from the University of Texas at Austin in 1993 and a Juris Doctor from the University of Houston Law Center in 1999.

Career 

From 1999 to 2001, Hamdani was an associate at Dow, Cogburn & Friedman PC. From 2001 to 2005, he was an associate at Winstead Sechrest & Minick PC. From 2005 to 2008, he was a founding partner of Hamdani & Simon LLP. From 2008 to 2012, he was an assistant United States attorney in the Eastern District of Kentucky. From 2012 to 2014, he served as deputy chief of the counterterrorism section of the National Security Division at the Department of Justice. From 2014 through 2022, he served as an assistant United States attorney in the United States Attorney's Office for the Southern District of Texas.

Notable cases 

Hamdani co-prosecuted the case of Leatrice Malika DeBruhl-Daniels, an NCIS agent convicted of "obstructing justice, making false statements, and accepting money and gifts for official acts". She failed to disclose her relationship with Nadal Diya, a Syrian businessman living in Dubai, from whom she accepted gifts and revealed to him the status of his visa application and other classified national security information, including that Diya was the subject of a counterterrorism investigation.

U.S. attorney for the Southern District of Texas 

On October 14, 2022, President Joe Biden announced his intent to nominate Hamdani to be the United States attorney for the Southern District of Texas. On November 14, 2022, his nomination was sent to the United States Senate. On December 1, 2022, his nomination was reported out of the Senate Judiciary Committee by voice vote. On December 6, 2022, his nomination was confirmed in the Senate by voice vote. He was sworn in by District Judge Randy Crane on December 12, 2022. He is the first Asian American and Pacific Islander to serve as a U.S. Attorney in the state of Texas. Hamdani was recommended to the post by Senators John Cornyn and Ted Cruz.

References

1970s births
Living people
Year of birth missing (living people)
Place of birth missing (living people)
20th-century American lawyers
21st-century American lawyers
Assistant United States Attorneys
Texas lawyers
United States Attorneys for the Southern District of Texas
United States Department of Justice lawyers
University of Houston Law Center alumni
University of Texas at Austin alumni